Andrii Diachkov (born 28 April 1985) is a Ukrainian volleyball player, a member of Ukraine men's national volleyball team and Montpellier UC.

Career

Clubs

Ukrainian period 
Andrii Diachkov started his volleyball career in the Ukrainian Superleague in 2005. He played for Azot-Spartack Cherkassy over two seasons in 2005/2007. With this team he won the Championship of Ukraine in 2005/2006. In the season 2006/2007 he became the Vice champion of Ukraine and took second place in Ukrainian Cup.

The next two seasons (2007/2009) Diachkov performed for Lokomotyv Kharkiv. He became a two time Ukrainian Cup winner, Champion of Ukraine and Vice champion of Ukraine. In volleyball season of 2008/2009 he became the best outside-hitter of the Championship.

Italian period 
In Italy Andrii played 3 years in Serie A1 of the Italian Volleyball League and 1 year in Seria A2:

 Esseti Carilo Loreto (2009-2010)
 Yoga Forli (2010-2011)
 Modena Volley (2011)
 Top Volley Latina (2011-2012)
 Volley Tricolore (Seria A2) (2012-2013)

Russian period 
Andrii Diachkov also played in 2011 in VC Lokomotiv Novosibirsk.

Greek period 
After his Italian adventure he signed a contract with Greek Foinikas Syros V.C. Diachkov helped the Foinikas claim second place in the League Cup tournament. The season 2014/2015 he played for Olympiacos S.C. where he won the League Cup title and took second place in the Championship of Greece.

French period 
From 2016 Andrii is playing in French Pro A League: Asul Lyon (2015/2016), Montpellier UC (2016/2018). In the 2016/2017 season he was selected in Dream Team of the regular season of French championship. Together with Montpellier UC Diachkov gained 3rd place in season 2016/2017.

National team 
He debuted with the Ukraine men's national volleyball team in 2008. With Ukraine national volleyball team Andrii participated:

 2009 CEV European Championship qualification
 2012 Olympic Games - European Qualification
 2013 CEV European Championship qualification
 2014 FIVB World Championship - European Qualification
 2015 CEV Volleyball European Championship
 2017 FIVB Volleyball World Championship European Qualification

Sporting achievements

Clubs 
 2005/2006  Ukrainian Championship, with Azot-Spartack, Cherkassy
 2006/2007  Ukrainian Championship, with Azot-Spartack, Cherkassy
 2007/2008  Ukrainian Cup, with Lokomotiv Kharkiv
 2007/2008  Ukrainian Championship, with Lokomotiv Kharkiv
 2008/2009  Ukrainian Championship, with Lokomotiv Kharkiv
 2008/2009  Ukrainian Cup, with Lokomotiv Kharkiv
 2014/2015  League Cup of Greece, with Olympiacos S.C.
 2014/2015  Championship of Greece, with Olympiacos S.C.
 2015/2016 5th place European CEV Cup, with Asul Lyon
 2016/2017  Championship of France, with Montpellier VUC

Individual 
 2005/2006 Ukrainian Championship - Most Valuable Player Game Day 3
 2008/2009 Ukrainian Championship - Best Outside Hitter
 2014/2015 Championship of Greece - Most Valuable Player Game Day 9
 2014/2015 Championship of Greece - Most Valuable Player Game Day 5
 2016/2017 Championship of France  AllStar Team of The Regular Season

References

External links 
 CEV profile
 Personal website
 Legavolley profile

1985 births
Living people
Ukrainian men's volleyball players
Olympiacos S.C. players
VC Lokomotyv Kharkiv players